Alison Campbell (née Smyth) is the 1982 Miss Northern Ireland who currently runs a modelling agency. Her clients have included Zöe Salmon from Blue Peter and Orlaith McAllister from Big Brother. She is married to the professional golfer Darren Clarke.

References

Living people
Businesspeople from Northern Ireland
Irish beauty pageant winners
Irish women in business
Year of birth missing (living people)
People from County Tyrone